Jang Min-gyu (born 6 March 1999) is a South Korean footballer currently playing as a defender for Machida Zelvia.

Career
Jang Min-gyu begin first youth career with Bupyeong High School, when entered to Hanyang University. In 2019, he was selected for the first time to the South Korea national under-23 football team, which is aiming to qualify for the 2020 Olympics in Tokyo.

Jang Min-gyu begin first professional career with JEF United Chiba in 2020. He leave from the club in 2022 after three years at Chiba.

On 7 December 2022, Jang Min-gyu officially transfer to J2 club, Machida Zelvia for upcoming 2023 season.

Career statistics

Club
.

Notes

References

External links

1999 births
Living people
South Korean footballers
South Korean expatriate footballers
Association football defenders
J2 League players
JEF United Chiba players
FC Machida Zelvia players
South Korean expatriate sportspeople in Japan
Expatriate footballers in Japan